Arts & Crafts: X is a compilation album, released on May 28, 2013. Featuring artists signed to the Canadian record label Arts & Crafts in collaboration, it is the second compilation released by the label, following Arts & Crafts: 2003−2013, as part of its tenth anniversary celebrations.

Track listing
 "Day of the Kid" –  Broken Social Scene and Years - 5:48
 "Bizarre Love Triangle" (New Order) - Apostle of Hustle and Zeus - 3:42
 "Homage" - Feist and Timber Timbre - 4:09
 "Era" - Still Life Still and Zulu Winter - 4:08
 "The Chauffeur" (Duran Duran) - The Hidden Cameras and Snowblink - 4:34
 "Time Can Be Overcome" (The Constantines) - The Darcys and Ra Ra Riot - 4:01
 "Nothing Good Comes to Those Who Wait" - Chilly Gonzales and Stars - 3:37
 "Lonely Is as Lonely Does" - Hayden and Jason Collett - 4:10
 "Lady Bird" (Nancy Sinatra and Lee Hazlewood) - Gold & Youth and Trust - 3:15
 "Chances Are" (Johnny Mathis and Liza Minnelli)- Amy Millan and Dan Mangan - 4:39
 "Waltz #2 (XO)" (Elliott Smith) - Dan Mangan and Zeus (iTunes-only bonus track)

References

2013 compilation albums
Compilation albums by Canadian artists
Record label compilation albums
Arts & Crafts (record label) compilation albums